The Sri Lankan leopard (Panthera pardus kotiya) is a leopard subspecies native to Sri Lanka. It was first described in 1956 by Sri Lankan zoologist Paules Edward Pieris Deraniyagala.

Since 2020, the Sri Lankan leopard has been listed as Vulnerable on the IUCN Red List, as the population is estimated at less than 800 mature individuals, and is probably declining.

Characteristics 

The Sri Lankan leopard has a tawny or rusty yellow coat with dark spots and close-set rosettes.
The Sri Lankan leopard has possibly evolved to become a rather large leopard subspecies, because it is the apex predator in the country. Large males have been suggested to reach almost , but evidence for this is lacking.

Melanistic leopards are rare. Few records exist, including from Mawuldeniya, Pitadeniya, and Nallathanniya. In October 2019, the Department of Wildlife Conservation recorded live footage of a melanistic individual for the first time, a male.

Distribution and habitat 

The Sri Lankan leopard is still found in all habitats throughout the island in both protected and unprotected areas. These habitat types can be broadly categorised into:
Arid zone with < rainfall
Dry zone with  rainfall
Wet zone with > rainfall
In Sri Lanka's central hills, leopards have been recorded in forest patches, tea estates, grasslands, home gardens, and pine and eucalyptus plantations.

Ecology and behaviour 
In Yala National Park, the Sri Lankan leopard as in other locations, is a solitary hunter, with the exception of females with young. Male's ranges typically overlap the smaller ranges of several females, as well as portions of the ranges of neighboring males, although exclusive core areas are apparent. They are more active and prefer hunting at night, but are also somewhat active during dawn, dusk, and daytime hours. They rarely haul their kills into trees, which is likely due to the lack of intraguild competition and the relative abundance of prey. In 2001 to 2002, adult resident leopard density was estimated at 12.1 mature individuals and 21.7 individuals of all ages per  in Block I of Yala National Park.

The Sri Lankan leopard hunts by silently stalking its prey, until it is within striking distance, when it unleashes a burst of speed to quickly pursue and pounce on its victim. The prey is usually dispatched with a single bite to the throat. Like most cats, it is pragmatic in its choice of diet, which can include small mammals, birds, and reptiles, as well as larger animals. Sri Lankan axis deer make up the majority of its diet in the dry zone. The animal also preys on sambar, barking deer, wild boar, and monkeys.

No birth season or peak is apparent, with births occur across the year. 
Its lifespan ranges from 12 to 15 years in the wild, and up to 22 years in captivity.

The leopard is sympatric with the Sri Lankan sloth bear.

Threats 
The survival of the Sri Lankan leopard is primarily threatened by increasing habitat loss and fragmentation, together with an increasing risk of human-induced mortality. Leopards are killed by people either accidentally in wire snares set for other species, or as retaliation after livestock depredation (usually through poisoning the livestock carcass). They are also occasionally shot. Since 2010, over 90 leopards are known to have been killed by people in Sri Lanka.

Three individuals were killed by snare traps in the Sinharaja conservation area, one of which is stuffed and displayed at the Giritale Wildlife Museum. In May 2020, the melanistic leopard filmed in 2019 was found caught in a snare at the Lakshapana Estate in Nallathanniya, Hatton. Later, it was transported to Elephant Transit Home in Udawalawa for treatment, where it died. The snare had heavily injured its neck.
Even in large, contiguous protected areas, human encroachment in the border areas is impacting leopard distribution and reducing the effective size of these protected areas.

Conservation 

Ongoing research into the Sri Lankan leopard is needed to ensure that conservation measures are targeted and effective. The Leopard Project under the Wilderness and Wildlife Conservation Trust (WWCT), founded by Anjali Watson, and Dr. Andrew Kittle is working closely with the Government of Sri Lanka to ensure this occurs. The Sri Lanka Wildlife Conservation Society will also undertake some studies.  The WWCT is engaged throughout the island with targeted work ongoing in the central hills region where fragmentation of the leopard's habitat is rapidly occurring.

In captivity 
As of December 2011,  75 captive Sri Lankan leopards were in zoos worldwide. Within the European Endangered Species Programme, 27 male, 29 female and 8 unsexed individuals are kept.

Local names 
The leopard is colloquially known as kotiyā and chiruthai. Panthera pardus kotiya is the kotiyā proper.

See also 

Leopard subspecies
Chinese leopard
Zanzibar leopard

References

External links 

Leopards
Endemic fauna of Sri Lanka
Mammals of Sri Lanka
Endangered fauna of Asia
Apex predators